Steinfurt is a city in North Rhine-Westphalia, Germany.

Steinfurt may also refer to:

 Steinfurt (district), a district of North Rhine-Westphalia, Germany
 Steinfurt I – Borken I, an electoral constituency in North Rhine-Westphalia, Germany
 Steinfurt III, an electoral constituency in North Rhine-Westphalia, Germany

See also
 
 Steinfort (disambiguation)